IBAC was a  professional cycling team that existed in 1963 and 1964.

References

External links

Cycling teams based in Italy
Defunct cycling teams based in Italy
1963 establishments in Italy
1964 disestablishments in Italy
Cycling teams established in 1963
Cycling teams disestablished in 1964